Heritage Park is a suburb in the City of Logan, Queensland, Australia.

History
The area was first settled by Joseph Shirley and William George in the area of the present landfill; at that time it was part of Browns Plains. Suburban development commenced in 1985.

The suburb name Heritage Park was proposed by the land developer and formally adopted in 1991.

The median age of the Heritage Park population was 32 years, 5 years below the national median of 37. 70.1% of people living in Heritage Park were born in Australia. The other top responses for country of birth were New Zealand 8.6%, England 4.5%, Scotland 1.3%, Philippines 1.1%, South Africa 0.9%, South America 0.1%. 83.9% of people spoke only English at home; the next most common languages were 1.4% Samoan, 0.9% Arabic, 0.7% Punjabi, 0.6% Hindi, 0.6% Serbian, 0.1% Spanish.

Facilities
Logan Metro inSports Gym is at 357-395 Browns Plains Road. This building offers an array of activities: a full equipped gymnasium, group class salon, meeting and business rooms, childminding for gym members, indoor soccer fields and a coffee shop.
 
Browns Plains Waste & Recycling Facility is at 41 Recycle Way. It has dedicated facilities for recycling, green waste, and large steel, in addition to regular garbage disposal. Recycled materials are sold through the Logan Recycling Market with profits supporting community groups.

Heritage Park Shopping Centre is 298-328 Bayliss Road. It contains a medical centre, a Friendly Grocer shop, a hair dresser salon and a coffee shop.

Amenities
There are a number of parks in the area, including :

 Isle Of Ely Park
 Koala Park

 Spurway Park

Education
There are no schools in Heritage Park. The nearest primary schools are Yugumbir State School in neighbouring Regents Park to the west and Browns Plains State School in neighbouring Browns Plains to the north-west. The nearest secondary school is Browns Plains State High School in Browns Plains.

References

External links

 

Suburbs of Logan City